{{DISPLAYTITLE:C6H5NO}}
The molecular formula C6H5NO (molar mass: 107.11 g/mol, exact mass: 107.0371 u) may refer to:

 2-Formyl pyridine, or pyridine-2-carboxaldehyde
 Nitrosobenzene